Olszanka may refer to:

Olszanka, Lesser Poland Voivodeship (south Poland)
Olszanka, Biłgoraj County in Lublin Voivodeship (east Poland)
Olszanka, Gmina Kraśniczyn in Lublin Voivodeship (east Poland)
Olszanka, Gmina Łopiennik Górny in Lublin Voivodeship (east Poland)
Olszanka, Lublin County in Lublin Voivodeship (east Poland)
Olszanka, Łosice County in Masovian Voivodeship (east-central Poland)
Olszanka, Wyszków County in Masovian Voivodeship (east-central Poland)
Olszanka, Żyrardów County in Masovian Voivodeship (east-central Poland)
Olszanka, Opole Voivodeship (south-west Poland)
Olszanka, Augustów County in Podlaskie Voivodeship (north-east Poland)
Olszanka, Białystok County in Podlaskie Voivodeship (north-east Poland)
Olszanka, Sejny County in Podlaskie Voivodeship (north-east Poland)
Olszanka, Sokółka County in Podlaskie Voivodeship (north-east Poland)
Olszanka, Gmina Filipów in Podlaskie Voivodeship (north-east Poland)
Olszanka, Gmina Przerośl in Podlaskie Voivodeship (north-east Poland)
Olszanka, Gmina Rutka-Tartak in Podlaskie Voivodeship (north-east Poland)
Olszanka, Gmina Szypliszki in Podlaskie Voivodeship (north-east Poland)
Olszanka, Pomeranian Voivodeship (north Poland)
Olszanka River in north-east Poland

See also
 
Olshanka